Travunia is a genus of harvestman in the family Travuniidae. There are about five described species in Travunia. They are found in caves in the southern
Dinaric Karst region of Balkan Europe.

Species
These five species belong to the genus Travunia:
 Travunia anophthalma (Absolon & Kratochvil, 1927)
 Travunia borisi (Hadži, 1973)
 Travunia hofferi (Šilhavý, 1937)
 Travunia jandai (Kratochvíl, 1937)
 Travunia troglodytes (Roewer, 1915)

References

Further reading

 
 
 

Harvestmen